Matthew Flynn is an Australian rules footballer playing for the Greater Western Sydney Giants in the Australian Football League. Debuting at the age of 23 in Round 1 of the 2021 AFL Season, Flynn was made to wait for his AFL debut and did due to main ruck; Brayden Preuss battling injury.

Early life and AFL career 
Growing up in Narrandera in southern NSW, Matthew Flynn joined the GIANTS Academy at the age of 12. He was selected with pick 41in the 2015 AFL Draft as a developing ruckman Flynn didn't manage to make an AFL appearance in his first few years at the club, missing a season with an ACL injury.

References

External links
 

Living people
Year of birth missing (living people)
Greater Western Sydney Giants players
People from the Riverina